The Fortress of Solitude is a musical with music and lyrics written by Michael Friedman, and a book by Itamar Moses adapted from The Fortress of Solitude by Jonathan Lethem.

Synopsis
According to The Public Theater's website, "The Fortress of Solitude is the extraordinary coming-of-age story about 1970s Brooklyn and beyond — of black and white, soul and rap, block parties and blackouts, friendship and betrayal, comic books and 45s. And the story of what would happen if two teenagers obsessed with superheroes believed that maybe, just maybe, they could fly".

Productions
The musical premiered at Vassar College and New York Stage and Film's Powerhouse Theatre, as a part of the Martel Musical Workshops (concert readings of works-in-progress), opening on June 29, 2012 and closing July 1. The show was directed (and originally conceived) by Daniel Aukin, with Kyle Beltran, Alex Brightman, John Ellison Conlee, André De Shields, Carla Duren, Santino Fontana, Brandon Gill, Conlin Hanlon, Rebecca Naomi Jones, Jahi Kearse, Meghan McGeary, Lauren Molina, and David St. Louis.

The Dallas production at Dallas Theater Center opened on March 7, 2014 and closed on April 6. The show was directed by Daniel Aukin, set design Eugene Lee, lighting design Tyler Micoleau, costume design Jessica Pabst, sound design Robert Kaplowitz, projection design Jeff Sugg, wig design Leah J. Loukas, choreography Camille A. Brown, musical director Kimberly Grigsby, orchestrations John Clancy & Matt Beck. The band was composed of Grigsby (conductor, keyboard 2), Alex Vorse (associate music director, keyboard 1, keyboard programmer), Joe Lee (guitar), Peggy Honea (bass), Mike Drake (drums), Jorge Ginorio (Latin percussion), Pete Brewer (reeds), Cathy Richardson (viola/violin), and Larry Spencer (trumpet/Fleugelhorn/piccolo trumpet).

The Off-Broadway production opened on September 30, 2014 (previews), officially on October 22 at The Public Theater, a co-production with the Dallas Theater Center. The show wass directed by Daniel Aukin with choreography by Camille A. Brown. The show closed on November 16.

Cast

Musical numbers
Source: CurtainUp

Act 1
Prelude — Barrett Rude Junior, Subtle Distinction, Dylan, Rachel
The One I Remember — Full Company
The Time Keeps Changing — Dylan, Barrett Rude Junior, Rachel
(You Gotta) Grab Something — Barrett Rude Junior, Subtle Distinction
Superman/Sidekick — Mingus, Dylan, Barret Rude Junior, Subtle Distinction
White Boy — Arthur, Abby, Marilla, Dylan
The Ballad of Barrett Rude, Sr. — Barrett Rude Senior, Abby, Marilla, Liza
Painting — Abraham, Mingus
This Little World — Mingus, Rachel, Abraham, Dylan, Barrett Rude Junior
Take Me to the Bridge — Barrett Rude Senior, Mingus, Dylan, Ensemble
High High High School/Fuck You Up — Mike, Skate Girl, Dylan, Robert, Arthur
I'm Busy Now (So Don't Bother Me) — Marilla, Lala, Subtle Distinction, Ensemble

Act 2
Act Two Prelude — Rachel
If I Had Known Then (What I Know Now) — Barrett Rude Junior, Subtle Distinction
Bothered Blue — Barrett Rude Junior, Subtle Distinction, Dylan, Rachel
Take It Baby — Barrett Rude Junior, Subtle Distinction, Dylan, Rachel
Who's Calling Me — Barrett Rude Junior, Subtle Distinction, Dylan, Rachel
Something — Abby, Rachel, Abraham
This Little World (Reprise) — Dylan, Abby, Rachel, Barrett Rude Junior, Subtle Distinction
The Ballad of Mingus Rude — Mingus, Robert, Ensemble
Superman/Superman (Reprise) — Mingus, Ensemble
The Gift — Rachel, Ensemble
Middle Space — Dylan, Mingus, Ensemble

Awards and nominations

Original Off-Broadway production

References

External links
 Lortel Archives Entry

2014 musicals
Musicals based on novels
Off-Broadway musicals
Plays about race and ethnicity
Plays by Michael Friedman
Plays set in the 1970s
Plays set in New York City